Carsten Dahl is a Danish pianist.

References

External links
 Official site

1967 births
Living people
Danish jazz pianists
Hard bop pianists
Musicians from Copenhagen
Danish jazz composers
21st-century pianists
Storyville Records artists
ACT Music artists
Stunt Records artists
NorCD artists